Shope may refer to:

People
Richard Shope (1901–66), an American virologist
Robert Shope (1929–2004), an American virologist
Simeon P. Shope (1837–1920), an American politician
T. J. Shope (born 1985), an American politician
J'Beth Shope ( born 1974) A native of Ohio USA

Other uses
Shope papilloma virus, a virus that causes cancer in rabbits
Shopi, a group of people in the Balkans
USS Samaritan (AH-10), a ship also known as SS Shope
Jennifer Shope, a character in the Canadian animated TV series Supernoobs